Helogenes is a genus of whale catfish found in tropical South America.

Helogeneinae is the sister taxon of Cetopsinae, the other subfamily in the family Cetopsidae.

Species 
There are currently four recognized species in this genus:
 Helogenes castaneus (Dahl, 1960)
 Helogenes gouldingi Vari & H. Ortega, 1986
 Helogenes marmoratus Günther, 1863
 Helogenes uruyensis Fernández-Yépez, 1967

Distribution
Helogenes species occur through much of the Amazon River basin, the southern portions of the Orinoco River basin, the coastal rivers of the Guianas, and at least the lower portions of the Tocantins River.

Description
In Helogenes, the dorsal fin base is short, the anal fin base is elongate, the dorsal and pectoral fins lack spines, the adipose fin is usually present, but is reduced or absent in one population of one species. Helogenes species grow to about 4.3–7.3 centimetres (1.7–2.9 in) SL.

Ecology
Helogenes species feed on allochthonous insects.  The only species for which details of the ecology are known is H. marmoratus (refer to article for that species).

References

Cetopsidae
Fish of the Amazon basin
Catfish genera
Taxa named by Albert Günther
Freshwater fish genera